PEZY Computing is a Japanese fabless computer chip design company specialising in the design of manycore processors for supercomputers.

History
PEZY Computing was founded in 2010.

The company's first manycore processor the PEZY-1 was launched in 2012. A successor the PEZY-SC launched 2014.

In 2015, computers using PEZY processors occupied the top 3 slots on the Green 500 supercomputer list the most efficient was RIKEN's  Shoubu computer with 7.03 GFLOPS/Watt.

In late 2016, PEZY and Imagination Technologies announced a partnership to use Imagination's 64-bit MIPS "Warrior" CPUs together with PEZY's SC2 manycore processors in future high performance computing applications.

In early 2017, the PEZY-SC2 chip was launched. In Nov 2017 the Gyoukou supercomputer was unveiled, incorporating PEZY-SC2 chips.

In December 2017, PEZY President Motoaki Saito, and PEZY employee, Daisuke Suzuki, were arrested on a charges of fraud that is padding expenses claims to Japan's New Energy and Industrial Technology Development Organization (NEDO) to the amount of $3.8 million. (¥431 million) In January 2018, further criminal activity was reported as being under investigation by the Tokyo District Prosecutor's Office that is a further ¥191 million extracted illegally as subsidies. In July 2018 Daisuke Suzuki received a suspended prison sentence of three years, for his involvement in the fraud -  was found to have played a minor associative role to Saito.

Notes
 The name PEZY is an acronym derived from the Greek derived metric prefixs peta-, exa-, zetta-, and yotta-.

References

Coprocessors
Fabless semiconductor companies
Manycore processors
Supercomputing in Japan
Technology companies established in 2010
Japanese companies established in 2010
Semiconductor companies of Japan